The General Prosecutor of the Republic of Bulgaria heads the system of courts known as the Office of the Prosecutor of the Republic of Bulgaria. The Prosecutor General can be appointed for a term of seven years and removed by the President of Bulgaria on recommendation from the Supreme Judicial Council (SJC). The President's appointment is only formal, and the decision to appoint or dismiss the General Prosecutor is made by the council. Upon appointment, the General Prosecutor becomes an ex officio member of the SJC. Candidates can only hold the position for one term.

List of General Prosecutors
The following is a list of Prosecutor Generals of Bulgaria since the Bulgarian People's Republic up until the present.

References

External links
Official website

Judiciary of Bulgaria
Bulgarian prosecutors

Government of Bulgaria